Robinette may refer to:


People
Robinette is a surname and given name, a variant of Robinett, derived from the given name Robin, French diminutive of Robert. People with the name include:

Surname
 Garland Robinette (born 1943), American journalist
 John Josiah Robinette, (1906–1996), Canadian lawyer
 Lloyd M. Robinette (1881–1951), American lawyer and politician
 Gary Robinette, 1980 Southern Conference Baseball Player of the Year
 Gusta A. Robinette, missionary and first female district superintendent in the Methodist Church - see Timeline of women in religion (1959)
 Joseph Robinette, nominated for the 2013 Tony Award for Best Book of a Musical for A Christmas Story: The Musical
Brianne Robinette (1989)

Given name
 Joseph Robinette "Joe" Biden Jr.  (born 1942), 46th and current president of the United States 
 Joseph Robinette Biden Sr. (1915–2002), father of Joe Biden
 Beau Biden (Joseph Robinette Biden III, 1969–2015), son of Joe Biden; American politician and lawyer; former Attorney General of Delaware
 Mary Robinette Kowal (born 1969); American author and puppeteer

Fictional characters
 Paul Robinette, on the TV drama series Law & Order
 Robinette Broadhead, protagonist of the science fiction novel Gateway and character in various sequels
 Robinette, in the 1765 opera La fée Urgèle
 Raine Robinette, in the 1977 Walker Percy novel Lancelot (novel)

Places in the United States
 Robinette, Oregon, a former unincorporated community flooded after the building of the Brownlee Dam
 Robinette, West Virginia, a census-designated place
 Fort Robinette, on the National Register of Historic Places listings in Alcorn County, Mississippi

See also
Ohio v. Robinette, a US Supreme Court case in 1996
Robinet (disambiguation)
Robinett (disambiguation), a surname